Eduardo Zamacois y Quintana (17 February 1873 – 31 December 1971) was a Cuban-Spanish novelist and journalist. A leading figure of the boom of short novel collections in Spain, and a representative of the bohemian literary scene in the country, he spent a substantial part of his life in Paris and, following the end of the Spanish Civil War, exiled in the Americas.

Biography
Eduardo María Zamacois y Quintana was born on 17 February 1873 in "La Ceiba" estate, near Pinar del Río, Cuba, the only son of Spanish Pantaleón Zamacois y Urrutia (a Basque migrant to Cuba) and Victoria Quintana y González (a native Cuban). His father's relatives included numerous artists: writers, actors and musicians. He was nephew of Spanish writer Niceto de Zamacois, the singer Elisa Zamacois, the painter Eduardo Zamacois y Zabala, and the actor Ricardo Zamacois, and also was cousin of the French writer Miguel Zamacoïs and the music composer Joaquín Zamacois.

At 4 years, he left Cuba with his parents, and they lived briefly in Brussels and Paris before settling in Madrid. He also studied in Sevilla.

Leaving college to pursue literature, his first fiction was erotic, but realistic in its depictions of ordinary life. Persuaded by his mother, he married Cándida Díaz y Sánchez on 7 November 1895 in Madrid. But he had numerous lovers and preferred to live in Paris. He had two daughters, Gloria born in 1897, and Elisa born in 1898, and a son Fernando.

As journalist, he edited El Cuento Semanal and Los Contemporáneos, and, from 1897, worked for the weekly Germinal. Later he moved to Barcelona to write for El Gato Negro and ¡Ahí Va! before founding Vida Galante.

From 1905 it took a socialistic form as he grew to sympathise with the Republican cause. During World War I he lived in France, working as a correspondent for La Tribune. He returned to Spain and continued to write prolifically until the outbreak of the Spanish Civil War. He was a war correspondent in Madrid until 1937, and then in Valencia and Barcelona, where he published El asedio de Madrid ("The Siege of Madrid", 1938). After Barcelona's fall he fled to France, and thence to the US and Mexico, before settling in Argentina, where he eventually wrote his memoirs, Un hombre que se va... (1964).

His first wife died in 1933, and in 1956 he remarried his long-time lover, the Cuban Matilde Olimpia Fernández y Fuertes.

He died at 98, on 31 December 1971 in Buenos Aires. He is buried in Madrid.

Bibliography
El misticismo y las perturbaciones del sistema nervioso (1893).
Amar a oscuras (1894).
La enferma (1895).
Humoradas en prosa (1896).
Consuelo (1896)
Punto negro (1897)
Vértigos (1899)
Incesto (1900) 
Horas crueles (1901)
El seductor (1902)
Memorias de una cortesana (1904)
Sobre el abismo (1905)
Río abajo: almas, paisajes, perfiles perdidos. Madrid: Pueyo, 1905.
El otro (1910)
Teatro galante (1910)
Desde mi butaca (1911)
Crimen sin rastro (1911)
Europa se va... (1913)
La opinión ajena (1913).
Del camino (1913).
La cita (novelas cortas) (1913).
El misterio de un hombre pequeñito (1914).
La ola de plomo (1915).
Años de miseria y risa (1916).
Las confesiones de un niño decente (1916).
Presentimiento (1916).
La carreta de Thespis (1918).
La alegría de andar (1920).
Memorias de un vagón de ferrocarril (1922).
La bobina maravillosa (1922).
Una vida extraordinaria (1923).
Las raíces (1927), trilogía novelística. 
Los vivos muertos (1929)
La risa, la carne y la muerte (1930), selección de cuentos.
El delito de todos (1933)
La antorcha apagada (1935). 
Tipos de café, segunda edición (1935)
Don Juan hace economías, (1936), farsa grotesca.
Crónicas de la guerra (1937)
El asedio de Madrid (1938)
Un hombre que se va... Memorias (1964)
El teatro por dentro

References

Works cited

General references
 Janice J. Soler. "Eduardo Zamacois, a Forgotten Novelist." Kentucky Romance Quarterly, Volume 29, Issue 3 (1982), pages 307-322.
 Sang Joo Hwang. Vida y obra de Eduardo Zamacois (1873–1971). Universidad Complutense de Madrid Facultad de Filología, 1996.

External links
 
 
 

1873 births
1971 deaths
19th-century Spanish writers
Spanish people of French descent
Spanish novelists
Spanish male novelists
Spanish dramatists and playwrights
Spanish male dramatists and playwrights
Spanish journalists
Spanish newspaper editors
Exiles of the Spanish Civil War in Argentina
Spanish socialists
Spanish male short story writers
Spanish short story writers
19th-century short story writers
19th-century male writers
Spanish people of Basque descent
Spanish people of Cuban descent
Spanish expatriates in France